The MAMA Award for Artist of the Year (올해의 가수상) is a daesang (or grand prize) award presented by CJ E&M (Mnet) at the annual MAMA Awards. It was first awarded at the event's 8th ceremony held in 2006; the five-member boyband group TVXQ won the award, and it is given in honor for artists with artistic achievement, technical proficiency and overall excellence in the music industry.

Winners and nominees

2000s

2010s

2020s

 Each year is linked to the article about the Mnet Asian Music Awards held that year.

Artists with multiple wins
Throughout the history of MAMA Awards only 2 recipients received the award more than once. BTS are the only artist to receive the award for consecutive years.

7 wins
 BTS

3 wins
 Big Bang

Artists with multiple nominations 

7 nominations
 BTS
 Exo

5 nominations
 Big Bang
 Girls' Generation
 IU
 Twice

4 nominations
 Blackpink

3 nominations
 2NE1

2 nominations
 2PM
 Psy
 SG Wannabe
 Super Junior
 TVXQ
 Wanna One
 Wonder Girls

Notes

References

External links
 Mnet Asian Music Awards official website

MAMA Awards